Jerome Frink (born December 1, 1993) is an American basketball player for AB Contern of the Total League. He played college basketball for Florida International University (FIU) and LIU Brooklyn. He was named the 2017 Northeast Conference Player of the Year.

College career
Frink was recruited from St. Anthony High School in Jersey City, New Jersey, where he starred with future National Basketball Association player Kyle Anderson. He was recruited to FIU by coach Isiah Thomas and played two seasons for the Panthers before deciding to transfer closer to home. Frink was an immediate impact player for the Blackbirds, averaging 16.6 points and 9 rebounds per game and earning first-team All-Northeast Conference (NEC) honors. He followed this season as a senior by averaging 16.8 points and 8.9 rebounds and scoring NEC Player of the Year honors.

Professional career
In December 2019, Frink signed with Þór Þorlákshöfn of the Icelandic Úrvalsdeild karla, replacing fellow American Vincent Bailey.

On July 5, 2020, he has signed with AB Contern of the Total League.

References

External links
LIU Brooklyn Blackbirds bio
FIU Panthers bio

1993 births
Living people
American expatriate basketball people in the Dominican Republic
American men's basketball players
Basketball players from Jersey City, New Jersey
FIU Panthers men's basketball players
LIU Brooklyn Blackbirds men's basketball players
Power forwards (basketball)
St. Anthony High School (New Jersey) alumni
Windy City Bulls players
Þór Þorlákshöfn (basketball club) players
Úrvalsdeild karla (basketball) players